Murrimboola, New South Wales is a rural locality and civil parish of Harden County, New South Wales. The  parish is at Harden, New South Wales, on Currawong Creek.

References

Localities in New South Wales
Geography of New South Wales